Mubarak Marzouq Hamed Al-Issa (born 1 January 1961) is a Kuwaiti football defender who played for Kuwait in the 1982 FIFA World Cup. He also played for Tadamon.

References

External links
FIFA profile

1961 births
Kuwaiti footballers
Kuwait international footballers
Association football defenders
1982 FIFA World Cup players
Living people
Asian Games medalists in football
Footballers at the 1982 Asian Games
Asian Games silver medalists for Kuwait
Medalists at the 1982 Asian Games
Al Tadhamon SC players
Kuwait Premier League players